The 2015  Beach Soccer Intercontinental Cup was the fifth edition of the tournament, Beach Soccer Intercontinental Cup. It took place at Jumeirah Beach in Dubai, United Arab Emirates from 3 to 7 November 2015. Eight teams participated in the competition.

Participating teams

Group stage
All matches are listed as local time in Dubai, (UTC+4).

Group A

Group B

Classification stage

5–8 places

Seventh place match

Fifth place match

Championship stage

Semi-finals

Third place match

Final

Awards

Top scorers

Final standings

References

External links
Beach Soccer Worldwide
  Schedule & Results (PDF)

Beach Soccer Intercontinental Cup
Beach Soccer Intercontinental Cup
International association football competitions hosted by the United Arab Emirates
Intercontinental Cup
Intercontinental Cup